La Basse-Vaivre is a commune in the Haute-Saône department in the region of Bourgogne-Franche-Comté in eastern France.

Geography
The Côney forms the commune's northern and north-western borders.

See also
Communes of the Haute-Saône department

References

Communes of Haute-Saône